Onomasticon may refer to:
Onomasticon (Eusebius)
Onomasticon of Amenope
Onomasticon of Joan Coromines
Onomasticon of Julius Pollux
Onomasticon of Johann Glandorp
Onomasticon Anglo-Saxonicum (1897), or Searle's Onomasticon, by William George Searle